Felix Anthony Silla (January 11, 1937 – April 16, 2021), also credited as Felix Cilla, was an Italian character actor, circus performer, voice artist and movie stuntman, best known for his career in Hollywood in TV and film. 
  
Silla started his career in the circus, but is best known from television's The Addams Family as Cousin Itt, a costumed character. Itt was added exclusively for the TV series, and was not in Charles Addams original comic series. The character's voice was provided by series director Nat Perrin and Anthony Magro.

Silla featured in the Star Wars film  Return of the Jedi as one of the hang glider Ewoks.

He was also a voice artist on The Sims 2 video game.

Biography

Early life and circus career

Felix Silla was born in the small village of Roccacasale, Abruzzo, Italy. He trained as a circus performer and came to the United States aged 18, in 1955, touring with the Ringling Bros. and Barnum & Bailey Circus. His multiple talents as a bareback horse rider, trapeze artist, and tumbler brought him to Hollywood, where he became a stuntman, appearing in the film, A Ticklish Affair.

Film and television

His best-known roles include Litvak, the maniacal, miniature Hitler who menaces George Segal in film The Black Bird (his favorite role). He was also responsible for the physical performance of the robot Twiki in the TV series Buck Rogers in the 25th Century, a role for which the voice was supplied by Mel Blanc or Bob Elyea.  
 
In part due to his short stature of 1.19 m (3 ft 11 in), he often doubled for children in such movies as The Towering Inferno, The Hindenburg, and Battlestar Galactica as well as Meatballs 2 as the alien. Between movies, he frequently appeared in Las Vegas and Reno, Nevada, night clubs with his own musical combo, The Original Harmonica Band.

Voice-art work

Silla provided the voice for the video game The Sims 2 as Mortimer Goth 2005.

Famous characters

The Addams Family: Cousin Itt

Silla became famous however as the recurring costumed character of Cousin Itt on television's The Addams Family. The character was not part of Charles Addams's original comic, but was introduced in the original black and white television series by producer David Levy, debuting in the 1965 first-season episode "Cousin Itt Visits the Addams Family", and appearing in a total of 19 episodes, 17 which feature Silla and 2 with Roger Arroyo over the course of the show's two seasons. The character's voice was usually provided by studio sound engineer Anthony Magro (1923–2004). The character became so popular it was carried over to subsequent licensed media including film, stage and video games.

Star Wars: Ewoks

He played one of the hang glider Ewoks in the film Star Wars Return of the Jedi in 1983.

He also was the body actor for the robot Twiki in Buck Rogers in the 25th Century.

Death
Felix Silla died on April 16, 2021, from pancreatic cancer at the age of 84, in Las Vegas, Nevada.

Filmography (as Actor)

References

External links 

 

1937 births
2021 deaths
Actors with dwarfism
Deaths from cancer in Nevada
Deaths from pancreatic cancer
Italian emigrants to the United States
Italian male film actors
Italian male television actors
Male actors from Rome
People of Abruzzese descent
People of Lazian descent